In literature, action is the physical movement of the characters.

Action as a literary mode 
"Action is the mode [that] fiction writers use to show what is happening at any given moment in the story," states Evan Marshall, who identifies five fiction-writing modes: action, summary, dialogue, feelings/thoughts, and background. Jessica Page Morrell lists six delivery modes for fiction-writing: action, exposition, description, dialogue, summary, and transition. Peter Selgin refers to methods, including action, dialogue, thoughts, summary, scene, and description.

While dialogue is the element that brings a story and its characters to life on the page, and narrative gives the story its depth and substance, action creates the movement within a story. Writing a story means weaving all of the elements of fiction together.  When it is done right, weaving dialogue, narrative, and action can create a beautiful tapestry.  A scene top-heavy with action can feel unreal because it is likely that characters doing something—anything at all—would be talking during the activity.

See also 
 Action fiction
 Action film
 Pace (narrative)
 Show, don't tell

Notes

References

External links

Literary concepts
Narrative techniques